Dionis Çikani (born 10 March 1999) is a Greek professional footballer who plays as a midfielder for Drenica, on loan from Partizani Tirana.

Career statistics

Club

Notes

References

1999 births
Living people
Footballers from Athens
Greek footballers
Greek expatriate footballers
Albanian footballers
Albanian expatriate footballers
Association football midfielders
Tercera División players
Kategoria e Parë players
CF Torre Levante players
FK Partizani Tirana players
KF Drenica players
Greek expatriate sportspeople in Spain
Albanian expatriate sportspeople in Spain
Expatriate footballers in Spain
Albanian expatriate sportspeople in Kosovo
Expatriate footballers in Kosovo
Greek people of Albanian descent